ARD or Ard may refer to:

People
 Ard (surname), a surname of Scottish origin
 Ard (biblical figure), a son of Benjamin in the Bible
 Ard., abbreviation in scientific literature for botanist Pietro Arduino

Places
 Ard, Arkansas, U.S.
 Ard, Inverness, Scotland
 Ard, alternate name of Arad, Iran, a city in Fars Province
 ARD, the IATA code for Alor Island Airport, Indonesia
 Ardgay railway station, Scotland, station code
 Ardmore station (Pennsylvania), Philadelphia, US, Amtrak code
 Ardpatrick, Argyll, Scotland
 Ardpatrick, County Limerick, Republic of Ireland
 Ardpatrick, a townland in County Louth, Republic of Ireland, see List of townlands of County Louth
 Ardpatrick, a townland in County Tyrone, Northern Ireland, see List of townlands of County Tyrone

Organizations
 ARD (broadcaster), Arbeitsgemeinschaft der öffentlich-rechtlichen Rundfunkanstalten der Bundesrepublik Deutschland, German Association of Public Broadcasters
 Das Erste, primary television channel of the ARD, often called the same
 ARD International Music Competition
 Alliance for Restoration of Democracy, a Pakistani political movement
 American Research and Development Corporation, the first venture capital firm
 Army Reconnaissance Detachment 10, a special forces unit of the Swiss Armed Forces
 Democratic Republican Alliance, Alliance Républicaine Démocratique or ARD, a French political party of the Third Republic
 Republican Alliance for Democracy, an opposition party in Djibouti (Alliance Républicaine pour le Développement)
 Right Romania Alliance, Alianţa România Dreaptăa, short-lived electoral alliance in Romania

Science and technology
 Acid rock drainage, the outflow of acidic water from mines
 Acireductone dioxygenase (iron(II)-requiring), an enzyme
 Antimicrobial Removal Device, Marion Laboratories product
 Apple Remote Desktop, computer application
 Atmospheric Reentry Demonstrator, ESA spacecraft
 Auxiliary repair dock
 US Navy hull classification symbol for an auxiliary repair dry dock

Other uses
 Accelerated Rehabilitative Disposition, pretrial intervention program, Pennsylvania, US
 Aging-associated disease, a disease that is most often seen with increasing frequency with increasing senescence
Alcohol-related dementia
Ard (plough), a simple plough
 Ard, a character in the 1981 film Heavy Metal
 Ard Patrick, a horse

See also
 Ards (disambiguation)